Testimonies 2001 (Macedonian Cyrillic: Сведоштва 2001, Macedonian Latin: Svedoshtva 2001) is a book written by Macedonian General Pande Petrovski in 2006.

Synopsis
The general explains the American role in the crisis through Military Professional Resources Inc.'s (MPRI) proposals for reorganizing the Army of the Republic of Macedonia (ARM) and the Ministry of Defense which revealed the strategy of America of preparing Republic of Macedonia for a defeat from the inside in case of  war. 
Petrovski also describes his conversation with president Boris Trajkovski after he was asked to come back and rejoin the armed forces before the conflict started.

Media attention
А mother of one of the victims of the Macedonian defense forces stated that even one month after the publishing of the book it can't be found in any books stores in the capital Skopje, she had to go directly to the publisher's office for a copy.

See also
2001 insurgency in the Republic of Macedonia
List of books about Albanian terrorism in 2001 in Macedonia

References

External links
 Book publisher official page

Macedonian literature
2001 insurgency in Macedonia
2006 non-fiction books